El Benny is a Cuban film released in 2006, directed and co-written by Jorge Luis Sánchez, his first feature-length film.  It is a fictional story based on the life of the famous Cuban musician Benny Moré. It includes new versions of his songs performed by musicians including Chucho Valdés, Juan Formell, Haila and Orishas.

The film premiered in Cuba in July 2006, and was presented at the Locarno International Film Festival in August 2006, where its star, Renny Arozarena, won the Boccalino prize for best performance for protagonist in all sections of festival. The film was Cuba's candidate for the Academy Awards. The film won the "First Work" (Opera Prima) award at the New Latin American Cinema festival in Havana in December 2006. It received its official U.S. premiere at the "Palm Springs International Film Festival" on 6 January 2007, and its east coast premiere at the Miami International Film Festival in March 2007.

The director, Sánchez, is distantly related to Benny Moré.

Cast

Renny Arozarena: Benny Moré
Juan Manuel Villy Carbonell: Benny Moré (singing voice)
Enrique Molina: Olimpio
Carlos Ever Fonseca: Angeluis
Mario Guerra: Monchy
Limara Meneses: Aida
Isabel Santos: Maggie
Salvador Wood: Grandfather
Laura de la Uz: Irene
Kike Quiñones: Pedrito
Carlos Massola: León Arévalo
Félix Pérez: Genaro (Benny's grandfather)
Cheryl Zaldívar: Sofía
Husmell Díaz: Arnulfo
Serafín García Aguiar: Gutiérrez
Marcela Morales: Natalia
Rakel Adriana: Doñita
Bárbara Hernández: Lydia (nurse)
Jorge Ferdecaz: Olegario
Ulyk Anello: Duany
Mayra Mazorra: Benny's Mother
Carlos Arévalo: Músico Mexicano

See also 
 List of Cuban films
 List of Cuban submissions for the Academy Award for Best International Feature Film

References

External links
Official site

Page on the ICAIC website (In Spanish)

2006 films
Cuban musical films
2000s Spanish-language films
Films set in the 1950s
2000s musical films